August "Auguste" Jordan (21 February 1909 – 17 May 1990) was a French  football midfielder, who became a coach after his playing career.

Playing career
Born in Austria as August Jordan, he moved to France in 1933 and became French in 1938. His integration to France national football team during World War II was highly discussed because he was not a born and bred French, moreover an Austrian. However, Jordan was always fully dedicated and proud to wear the blue shirt of France. He was a participant for them at the 1938 FIFA World Cup. This integration caused him to be jailed by the Wehrmacht during the war. In France, he was nicknamed Gusti and the baby from Linz.

Honours

As a player
French championship (1):
 1936
Coupe de France (4):
 1936, 1939, 1940, 1945

As a coach
Jupiler League (1):
 1963 with Standard de Liège

External links
 Profile - French Football Federation
 Biography - Wearefootball

References

1909 births
1990 deaths
Footballers from Linz
French footballers
France international footballers
Austrian footballers
Austrian emigrants to France
Naturalized citizens of France
French people of Austrian descent
Association football midfielders
1938 FIFA World Cup players
LASK players
Racing Club de France Football players
Ligue 1 players
French football managers
Saarland national football team managers
Red Star F.C. managers
Olympique de Marseille managers
Standard Liège managers
Expatriate football managers in Belgium
Racing Club de France Football managers
1. FC Saarbrücken managers
SAS Épinal managers